Bullobunus is a genus of harvestmen in the family Sclerosomatidae from the Philippines.

Species
 Bullobunus ater Roewer, 1910
 Bullobunus culionicus Suzuki, 1977
 Bullobunus luteovittatus Roewer, 1910
 Bullobunus punctatus Suzuki, 1977
 Bullobunus rufus Roewer, 1955
 Bullobunus similis Roewer, 1910
 Bullobunus unicolor Suzuki, 1977

References

Harvestmen
Arachnid genera